The Federazione Italiana Rugby League is the governing body for the sport of rugby league football in Italy. The association was formed in 2008. They acquired full membership status of the RLEF in March 2017.

See also

 Rugby league in Italy
 Italy national rugby league team
 Italy women's national rugby league team

References

External links

Rugby league governing bodies in Europe
Rugby league in Italy
Rugby League
Sports organizations established in 2008